Love Like Blood may refer to:

"Love Like Blood" (song), a 1985 song by Killing Joke
Love Like Blood (band), a German rock band